The Sea Hawk is a 1915 novel by Rafael Sabatini.  The story is set over the years 1588–1593 and concerns a retired Cornish seafaring gentleman, Sir Oliver Tressilian, who is villainously betrayed by a jealous half-brother. After being forced to serve as a slave on a  galley, Sir Oliver is liberated by Barbary pirates.  He joins the pirates, gaining the name "Sakr-el-Bahr" (the hawk of the sea), and swears vengeance against his brother.


Plot summary

Sir Oliver Tressilian lives at the estate of Penarrow with his brother, Lionel. Oliver is betrothed to Rosamund Godolphin, whose hot-headed brother, Peter, detests the Tressilians due to an old feud between their fathers. Peter and Rosamund's guardian, Sir John Killigrew, also has little love for the Tressilians.

Peter's manipulations drive Oliver into a duel with Sir John. The scheme backfires: Sir John is seriously wounded, further stoking Peter's hatred. Peter attempts to bait Oliver into a violent confrontation, but Oliver is mindful of Rosamund's warning never to meet her brother in an affair of honor. One evening, Lionel returns home, bloodied and exhausted. He has killed Peter in a duel, but there were no witnesses. Oliver is widely believed to be Peter's killer, and Lionel does nothing to disprove the accusations. To avoid repercussions for Peter's death, Lionel has Oliver kidnapped and sold into slavery to ensure that he never reveals the truth. En route to the New World, the slave ship is boarded by the Spanish, and her crew are added to the slaves.

For six months Oliver toils at the oars of a Spanish galley. He befriends a Moorish slave, Yusuf-ben-Moktar. Oliver, Yusuf and the other slaves are freed when the galley is boarded by Muslim corsairs. They offer to fight for the Muslims. Oliver's fighting skills and the testimony of Yusuf, the nephew of the Basha of Algiers, grants Oliver special privileges in Muslim society. He becomes a corsair known as Sakr-el-Bahr, "the Hawk of the Sea". In this new role, Oliver rescues English slaves by purchasing them himself and releasing them in Italy.

Oliver captures a Spanish vessel and discovers his one-time kidnapper, Jasper Leigh, as a slave at the oars. He gives Jasper the opportunity to convert to Islam and join his corsairs. With Jasper's navigational skills, Sakr-el-Bahr sets sail for England to take revenge on Lionel.

Lionel has taken possession of Penarrow. He is now betrothed to Rosamund, who believes that Oliver murdered her brother. Sakr-el-Bahr carries them off to Algiers to be sold as slaves. The Basha sees Rosamund in the market and becomes infatuated with her, planning to buy her for himself. However, he does not have enough ready cash to meet the high bid, and Sakr-el-Bahr wins her instead. The Basha threatens to take her by force, but Sakr-el-Bahr marries her, foiling the Basha's efforts. He also buys Lionel and tricks him into revealing to Rosamund the truth about Peter's death. Rosamund is horrified at Lionel's lies and treachery, calls him a coward, and dismisses him from her, before Sakr-el-Bahr condemns him to serve as a rower in his own galley. Sir Oliver realizes how strong his guilt must have appeared to Rosamund, and loses his hatred for her.

Sakr-el-Bahr's refusal to sell Rosamund to the Basha infuriates the Basha, and the Basha threatens to have her carried off in spite of their hasty marriage. Seeing the danger into which he has brought Rosamund by carrying her to Algiers, Oliver regrets having abducted her. He begins to realize that he still loves her, and vows to return her safely to Europe with her honor intact, at the cost of his life, if necessary. To this end, he smuggles her aboard his galley, but is dismayed to find that the Basha, goaded into mistrust of Sakr-el-Bahr by his son and wife, and still consumed with desire for Rosamund, has resolved to accompany him on his next mission: an attempt to capture a Spanish treasure ship rumored to be passing from Spain to Italy.

Less than a day into the voyage, Rosamund's hiding place on the galley is discovered by the Basha's scheming son, Marzak. The Basha again attempts to take her by force, but Sakr-el-Bahr threatens mutiny, and it is clear that the crew would be equally divided between Sakr-el-Bahr and the Basha. Neither leader is willing to risk his goals on the hazard of an open conflict, and an uneasy stalemate results as the galley reaches its ambuscade and waits for the Spanish treasure ship to pass. Sir Oliver's protection of her in the face of what she believes to be certain death begins to reawaken Rosamund's respect and trust of him.

Unexpectedly, the first ship  they sight is an English ship bearing a pennant which Oliver and Rosamund recognize as belonging to Sir John Killegrew—Sir John has sworn an oath to rescue Lionel and Rosamund, and to hang Sakr-el-Bahr. Not realizing the proximity of the corsair, Sir John's ship comes to anchor just round the point from the hidden galley. Sir Oliver sees his chance to return Rosamund to safety, and at dusk contrives to have Lionel thrown overboard, ostensibly for insubordination, but in reality giving him secret instructions to swim round the point in the dark with a message for Sir John. Lionel reaches Sir John, and the English attempt to attack the corsairs, but the wind is very light and the Moorish galley, using her oars, is able to travel much faster than the English sailing ship. Oliver sees that they will surely escape the English ship, and hijacks command of the galley by threatening to detonate the open powder magazine with his torch. He compels the galley to allow the English ship to come alongside. The English crew boards the galley, and in an abortive fight, Lionel, who was first to board the galley, receives a pike thrust through the body from one of the Moors. Sakr-el-Bahr compels both sides to cease fighting, and negotiates a truce—he will surrender himself to Sir John, on the condition that the Moors will allow Rosamund to leave with the English, and that the English will allow the Moors to leave without further molesting them. The Basha, caught in a trap, outgunned, and furious at Sakr-el-Bahr's mutinies, is happy to give him to the English, deeming they will hang him. Sir John is content to let the Basha depart as long as Rosamund and Sir Oliver are in his custody, and the truce is agreed upon. The Basha's galley departs; Sakr-el-Bahr is flung into the hold, and told to prepare himself for execution. Rosamund, seeing Sir Oliver about to sacrifice his life to ensure her safety, realizes that she still loves him.

In the cabin of the English ship, Sir John is told that Lionel is mortally wounded and will likely never recover consciousness. Sir John; Lord Henry Goade, Queen's Lieutenant of Cornwall; and the other officers of the ship form a tribunal to pass judgment on Sir Oliver before hanging him. To their surprise and dismay, Rosamund defends him fiercely, telling them the true story of what happened. They at first believe her to be mad, and then later to be deliberately lying to cover up the man who they say has bewitched her, until word comes that Lionel has recovered consciousness and is asking for his brother. Lionel makes a full confession in the presence of the tribunal, and asks Sir Oliver to forgive him. Sir Oliver does, and Lionel passes away in his brother's arms as Sir Oliver mourns his death and remembers the happy years they had spent together. Faced with confirmation of all Rosamund has told them, the tribunal is forced to admit they have no ground for hanging Sir Oliver, and Lord Henry, as the Queen's Lieutenant, personally guarantees that he will ensure Sir Oliver is cleared of all charges when they arrive in England. The book closes with Sir Oliver and Rosamund on the deck of the ship, embracing as they look forward to a happy future.

Film adaptations 
Frank Lloyd directed and produced The Sea Hawk (1924), a silent film adaptation of the novel, which was fairly faithful to Sabatini's original plot.
The well-known film The Sea Hawk (1940), starring Errol Flynn, was originally planned as an adaptation of the novel, but an entirely different story was substituted under the same title.  Still a swashbuckling tale, however, the film used some footage taken directly from the 1924 adaptation.

The Sea Hawk was published as an Armed Services Edition in 1944.

See also

Cultural depictions of Philip II of Spain

References

External links 
 
 
 

1915 British novels
British historical novels
British novels adapted into films
Novels by Rafael Sabatini
Novels about pirates